Orenaia macneilli is a moth in the family Crambidae. It was described by Eugene G. Munroe in 1974. It is found in North America, where it has been recorded from California.

The wingspan is about 23 mm. Adults have been recorded on wing in August.

References

Evergestinae
Moths described in 1974